Abstinence is a voluntary restraint from indulging a desire or appetite for certain bodily activities that are widely experienced as giving pleasure.

Abstinence may also refer to:
Abstinence (band), an experimental industrial music project
"The Abstinence", a Seinfeld episode
Abstinence theory of interest in classical economics

See also